Tobin Anderson (born December 1, 1971) is an American basketball coach who is the current head coach of the Fairleigh Dickinson Knights men's basketball team.

Early life
Anderson grew up in Iowa and played at Interstate 35 High School in Truro where he was an all-star in 1990. His father, Steve, was the head coach at Interstate 35 High School for almost three decades and later coached at Douglas High School in Box Elder, South Dakota. Anderson played college basketball at Wesleyan University from 1991 to 1995, where as of 2022 he ranks 11th all-time in career scoring.

Coaching career
Anderson's coaching career began at Clarkson in 1996 as an assistant coach. After one season, he joined Dave Paulsen's coaching staff at Le Moyne for two seasons before returning to Clarkson as head coach. In five seasons with Clarkson, Anderson posted a 67–66 overall record before taking the head coaching position at Hamilton College. While at Hamilton, Anderson compiled a 118–63 record over seven seasons, which included three UCAA regular season titles and a bid to the 2006 NCAA Division III tournament. After the 2011 season, Anderson joined the coaching staff of Siena under Mitch Buonaguro, where he stayed for two seasons before accepting the head coaching position at St. Thomas Aquinas.

While with the Spartans, Anderson put together a 209–62 overall record, including five East Coast Conference regular season titles and six ECC tournament titles, reaching the NCAA Division II tournament in seven-straight seasons, including the Elite Eight in 2017. Under Anderson, St. Thomas Aquinas also defeated Division I St. John's 90–58 in an exhibition contest in 2015.

On May 3, 2022, Anderson was named the eighth men's basketball coach in Fairleigh Dickinson history, replacing Greg Herenda.

In his first season as coach of the Knights, Anderson led the team to the Northeast Conference championship game, where they fell to Merrimack. However, due to NCAA division reclassification rules, Merrimack was not eligible for the NCAA tournament, which allowed FDU to receive the NEC’s automatic bid to the tournament as conference runner-up. After the Knights defeated fellow #16 seed Texas Southern in the First Four, they advanced to face #1-seeded Purdue, whom they took down 63–58, becoming only the second #16 seed to ever defeat a #1 seed in the tournament.

Head coaching record

NCAA DI

NCAA DII

NCAA DIII

References

Living people
1971 births
American men's basketball coaches
Fairleigh Dickinson Knights men's basketball coaches
Siena Saints men's basketball coaches
Le Moyne Dolphins men's basketball coaches
Clarkson Golden Knights men's basketball coaches
Hamilton Continentals men's basketball coaches
Wesleyan Cardinals men's basketball players
Basketball coaches from Iowa
People from Madison County, Iowa
Florida State University alumni
St. Thomas Aquinas Spartans men's basketball